Matt Dillon (born 1964) is an American actor.

Matt Dillon or Matthew Dillon may also refer to:
Matthew Dillon (born 1966), computer programmer and founder of the DragonFly BSD and HAMMER projects
Matt Dillon (Gunsmoke), main character in the Western radio and TV drama Gunsmoke
Matt Dillon (chef), chef and restaurateur in Seattle, Washington
Matt Dillon, American infantry officer portrayed by Jon Hamm in the 2002 film We Were Soldiers

See also
Dillon (surname)